An enzyme immunoassay is any of several immunoassay methods that use an enzyme bound to an antigen or antibody. These may include:

 Enzyme-linked immunosorbent assay (ELISA) 
 Enzyme multiplied immunoassay technique (EMIT) 
 Fluorescent enzyme immunoassays (FEIAs)
 Chemiluminescent immunoassays (CLIAs)
 Radioimmunoassays (RIAs)